Saetta was one of four s built for the  (Royal Italian Navy) in the early 1930s. Completed in 1932, she served in World War II. She played a minor role in the Spanish Civil War of 1936–1939, supporting the Nationalists.

Design and description
The Freccia-class destroyers were enlarged and improved versions of the preceding . Their complement during wartime was 185 officers and enlisted men.

The Freccias were powered by two Parsons geared steam turbines, each driving one propeller shaft using steam supplied by three Thornycroft boilers.

Their main battery consisted of four  guns in two twin-gun turrets, one each fore and aft of the superstructure. Anti-aircraft (AA) defense for the Freccia-class ships was provided by a pair of  AA guns in single mounts amidships and a pair of twin-gun mounts for  machine guns. They were equipped with six  torpedo tubes in two triple mounts amidships. Although the ships were not provided with a sonar system for anti-submarine work, they were fitted with a pair of depth charge throwers. The Freccias could carry 54 mines.

Construction and career
Saetta was laid down by Cantieri del Tirreno at their Riva Trigoso shipyard on 27 May 1929, launched on 17 January 1932 and commissioned on 10 May.

Citations

Bibliography

External links
 Saetta (1932)  Marina Militare website

Freccia-class destroyers
1931 ships
World War II destroyers of Italy
Ships sunk by mines
World War II shipwrecks in the Mediterranean Sea
Maritime incidents in February 1943